Anders Bengtsson (born 6 March 1968) is a Swedish social democratic politician, member of the Riksdag 2002–2006.

References

Members of the Riksdag from the Social Democrats
Living people
1968 births
Members of the Riksdag 2002–2006
Place of birth missing (living people)